Neguri is an affluent district of Getxo, in Biscay, Basque Country. It is traditionally regarded as the residence of the prosperous Basque industrial bourgeoisie. Its name, coined in the 19th century, means Winter Town in Basque language.  

The neighbourhood is serviced by two Bilbao Metro line 1 stations, Neguri and Aiboa. 

Populated places in Biscay
Neighbourhoods in Spain
Getxo